Éric Alard (born 26 August 1967) is a French bobsledder who competed during the 1990s. He won a bronze medal in the two-man event at the 1995 FIBT World Championships in Winterberg. He also competed in the two man event at the 1998 Winter Olympics.

Alard in March 2007 started a website named Ordisport.fr, a French site devoted to sport coaching.

References

External links
Bobsleigh two-man world championship medalists since 1931
Netpme.fr interview with Alard 

French male bobsledders
Living people
1967 births
Olympic bobsledders of France
Bobsledders at the 1998 Winter Olympics